Karl Holmqvist (born 1964), is a Swedish artist known for his text based works, poetry and readings. Holmqvist has exhibited at the  ICA - Institute of Contemporary Arts 2009, CAM - Chelsea Art Museum, 2009, The Living Art Museum, Reykjavik (2008), Tensta Konsthall (2008) 	Manifesta 7 - Comitato Manifesta 7, Bolzano (2008) and at PERFORMA 05 - Performa, New York City, NY (2005)

External links
 Triple Canopy Voice recording of poem "You Thrust Me" by Florine Stettheimer
 ARTFACTS
 West London Projects
 Performa 5

1964 births
Living people
Swedish contemporary artists